Havili is the seventh studio album by the Oceanic group Te Vaka, released in 2011. It won second place in the ISC Awards.

The song "Logo te Pate" is featured in the 2016 Walt Disney Pictures film Moana. In 2022, it was certified Silver by the British Phonographic Industry (BPI).

Track listing

References

External links

2011 albums
Te Vaka albums